Jennifer E. Smith is an American marine ecologist and coral reef expert who works at the Scripps Institution of Oceanography. Her research investigates how physical and biological processes impact the function of marine communities.

Early life and education 
Smith was an undergraduate student at the California State Polytechnic University, Humboldt, where she majored in zoology. She moved to the University of Hawaiʻi at Mānoa for her doctoral research, which investigated algal blooms and the impacts of nutrients and invasive species on community structure supervised by  Tropical reefs are increasingly dominated by algal blooms, with different types of algal blooms emerging on different reefs in the Hawaiian Islands. She identified that non-indigenous marine algae require strategic management to avoid dominating over native plants.

Research and career 
After her PhD, Smith was appointed a postdoctoral researcher at the University of Hawaiʻi, where she worked on the causes of macroalgal blooms on Maui. Smith joined the Scripps Institution of Oceanography in 2005. She was appointed an Assistant Professor in 2008 and an Associate Professor in 2014. Her research investigates coral reef ecology and how various biological processes impact benthic communities. Specifically, she is interested in diversity within coral reef communities, and how to better understand coral reef restoration. She has visited the same coral reefs every year for over a decade, allowing her to better understand how they change over time. She also identified that adding a small amount of Asparagopsis to cattle feed can reduce the methane emissions from dairy cows.

Smith studied corals in the remote central Pacific and identified that in the absence of human disturbance, coral reefs were relatively resilient to climate-associated impacts.

Selected publications 
 Global analysis of nitrogen and phosphorus limitation of primary producers in freshwater, marine and terrestrial ecosystems
 Baselines and degradation of coral reefs in the Northern Line Islands
 High-frequency dynamics of ocean pH: a multi-ecosystem comparison

References 

Living people
California State Polytechnic University, Humboldt alumni
University of Hawaiʻi at Mānoa alumni
Scripps Institution of Oceanography faculty
1972 births